Raymond D. Breakenridge (August 17, 1897 – August 4, 1982) was an American rancher and politician.

Raymond Breakenridge was the youngest son of James and Helen Breakenridge. He was born in Winterset, Iowa, on August 17, 1897, and attended Winterset High School in his hometown, graduating in 1917. The next year, he married Vera M. Bowen, with whom he had a daughter. Breakenridge ran his own farm from 1919, on which he raised Shorthorn cattle. He was a member of several agricultural organizations as well as the local school board. Breakenridge was elected to the Iowa House of Representatives for the first time in 1954, as a Republican legislator from District 28. Breakenridge won a second consecutive term in 1956, and served until 1959. In retirement, he moved to Louisiana, where he died on August 4, 1982.

References

1897 births
1982 deaths
Republican Party members of the Iowa House of Representatives
20th-century American politicians
Farmers from Iowa
American cattlemen
School board members in Iowa
People from Winterset, Iowa